Grant Major (born 1955) is an art director from New Zealand who is most famous for his work on The Lord of the Rings films. He won an Oscar for The Lord of the Rings: The Return of the King.

Oscar nominations
All of these are in Best Art Direction.

2001 Academy Awards-Nominated for The Lord of the Rings: The Fellowship of the Ring. Nomination shared with Dan Hennah. Lost to Moulin Rouge!.
2002 Academy Awards-Nominated for The Lord of the Rings: The Two Towers. Nomination shared with Dan Hennah and Alan Lee. Lost to Chicago.
2003 Academy Awards-The Lord of the Rings: The Return of the King. Award shared with Dan Hennah and Alan Lee. Won.
2005 Academy Awards-Nominated for King Kong. Nomination shared with Dan Hennah and Simon Bright. Lost to Memoirs of a Geisha.
2021 Academy Awards-Nominated for The Power of the Dog. Nomination shared with Amber Richards.

Selected filmography

As production designer

 The Frighteners (1996)
 The Lord of the Rings: The Fellowship of the Rings (2001)
 The Lord of the Rings: The Two Towers (2002)
 The Lord of the Rings: The Return of the King (2003)
 King Kong (2005) 
 The Green Lantern (2011)
 Crouching Tiger, Hidden Dragon: Sword of Destiny (2016)
 X-Men: Apocalypse (2016)
 Mulan (2020)
 The Power of the Dog (2021)

References

External links

Best Art Direction Academy Award winners
Living people
1955 births
New Zealand artists
New Zealand designers
New Zealand production designers
Art directors